Johnson Mason Maury (May 1, 1847 – January 2, 1919) was an American architect and inventor who designed and built over 700 residential and commercial structures, mostly in Louisville, Kentucky where he pioneered Richardsonian Romanesque and Prairie School architecture in Kentucky. Maury is mostly known for his works on The Kenyon Building and The Kaufman-Strauss building. Maury attended Male High School. After graduation, Maury moved to Boston where he studied architecture for two years under architect H.H. Richardson who had designed the Grace Episcopal Church during the time of Maury's stay. Maury returned to Louisville and worked under Episcopal Church Architect William H. Redin for six years. Maury was also a founding member of The Kentucky Association of Architects, in which he served as Second Vice President, as well as President of the Louisville Chapter of the American Institute of Architecture.

Catalogue

Redin & Maury (1877)

Mason Maury (1882-1887;1895-1919)

Maury & Haupt (1887-1889)

Maury & Dodd (1889-1895)

Maury & Hillerich (1904-1909

Board of Trade Building
The Tobacco Warehouse and Trading Company Building
Underwriter's Reality Company Building

References 

1847 births
1919 deaths
Irish people of French descent
Architects from Louisville, Kentucky
Architecture in Kentucky
Fellows of the American Institute of Architects
Architects from Kentucky
Louisville Male High School alumni
19th-century American architects
Massachusetts Institute of Technology alumni
MIT School of Architecture and Planning alumni
Western Association of Architects
Burials at Cave Hill Cemetery